The 1971 NCAA University Division basketball tournament involved 25 schools playing in single-elimination play to determine the national champion of men's NCAA Division I college basketball. It began on March 13, 1971, and ended with the championship game on March 27 in Houston, Texas. A total of 29 games were played, including a third-place game in each region and a national third-place game.

UCLA, coached by John Wooden, won its fifth consecutive national title (its seventh all-time) with a 68–62 victory in the final game over Villanova, coached by Jack Kraft. Howard Porter of Villanova was named the tournament's Most Outstanding Player. However, Villanova's placement in the tournament was later vacated because it was found that Porter had signed with an agent prior to the competition. Having lost to undefeated, second-ranked Penn (coached by Dick Harter) twice before, Porter did not think they would make it past the regionals where third-ranked South Carolina was also in their path. However, Penn vanquished South Carolina by 15 points, then had their worst game of the year against Villanova in the East Regional final, losing 90–47. Villanova's first-place finish in the East Regional was relinquished to Penn, with the regional consolation game winner, Fordham (coached by Digger Phelps, a former Penn assistant coach), receiving second place.

Championship Game
UCLA was a heavy favorite over Villanova in the title game. But the Bruins did not cruise through the season in their accustomed fashion. They were severely threatened in their own conference (and backyard) by second-ranked USC, who lost only twice all season – both to UCLA. In addition, UCLA lost at Notre Dame and had several other close calls against Washington, Oregon, and Oregon State. In the West Regional final, the Bruins trailed Long Beach State by 11 points midway through the second half, and their star player Sidney Wicks was on the bench with four personal fouls. But Wicks returned and avoided his fifth foul (and disqualification), and the Bruins rallied to take a 55–53 lead.  With 20 seconds remaining, Wicks sank two clinching free throws and UCLA escaped 57–55.

In the national championship game, UCLA jumped out to an early lead, but star players Sidney Wicks and Curtis Rowe struggled against Villanova's stingy zone defense.  Only the outside shooting of Henry Bibby and a career best 29 points from center Steve Patterson kept the Bruins in the lead. In the meantime, Villanova stars Howard Porter and Chris Ford overcame early struggles to keep the Wildcats in the game.  Midway through the second half, UCLA coach John Wooden ordered the Bruins to go into a four-corner stall offense (there was no shot clock in college basketball in 1971), a tactic he rarely employed.  Wooden said after the game he did so to bring Villanova out of their zone, and because he wanted to use the stage of the national championship game to show the NCAA that they should adopt a shot clock (something Wooden had long argued for). However, the tactic almost backfired as Villanova started forcing turnovers with an aggressive man-to-man defense. In addition, the stall took UCLA out of its offensive rhythm. Villanova closed the gap to 63–60 and had the ball with one minute to play. However, Porter missed a 15-foot off-balance jumper, Wicks grabbed the rebound, and UCLA made 5 of 6 free throws down the stretch to win 68–62.

In the national 3rd-place game, Western Kentucky defeated Kansas 77–75.

In a situation similar to Villanova's, Western Kentucky's placement in the tournament was vacated due to an NCAA investigation that showed Jim McDaniels had signed a professional contract and accepted money during the 1970–71 season.  Western Kentucky would be found in violation twice more in the next 10 years, earning the school a "lack of institutional control" violation.  This made the 1971 Final Four officially the first without a school from east of the Mississippi River.  The 2021 Final Four is the first to actually have all four teams come from west of the Mississippi (Baylor, Gonzaga, Houston and UCLA).

The total attendance for the tournament was 220,447, a new record. The crowd of 31,765 for the championship game was also a new record.

Schedule and venues
The following are the sites that were selected to host each round of the 1971 tournament:

First round
March 13
East Region
 Alumni Hall, Jamaica, New York
 WVU Coliseum, Morgantown, West Virginia
 The Palestra, Philadelphia, Pennsylvania
Mideast Region
 Athletic & Convocation Center, Notre Dame, Indiana
Midwest Region
 Hofheinz Pavilion, Houston, Texas
West Region
 USU Assembly Center, Logan, Utah

Regional semifinals, 3rd-place games, and finals (Sweet Sixteen and Elite Eight)
March 18 and 20
East Regional, Reynolds Coliseum, Raleigh, North Carolina
Mideast Regional, Georgia Coliseum, Athens, Georgia
Midwest Regional, Levitt Arena, Wichita, Kansas
West Regional, Special Events Center, Salt Lake City, Utah

National semifinals, 3rd-place game, and championship (Final Four and championship)
March 25 and 27
Astrodome, Houston, Texas

The city of Houston became the 10th host city, and the Astrodome the 11th host venue, to host the Final Four.  It was the first time the Final Four was held in the state of Texas, and the first time the Final Four was held in a domed stadium (or, for that matter, in a baseball or football venue of any kind), though the trend would not take off until the usage of the Louisiana Superdome eleven years later. The tournament saw six new venues used besides the Astrodome. The Mideast regional brought the tournament to the state of Georgia for the first time, with games held at the Georgia Coliseum on the campus of the University of Georgia. For the second time, the tournament came to the campus of the University of Utah, with the Special Events Center, a future Final Four venue, hosting games for the first time. The tournament came to West Virginia for the first time, with one of the three East sub-regional games held at the WVU Coliseum. In the Mideast sub-regional, the tournament came to its third new host city – South Bend, home of the University of Notre Dame and the Athletic & Convocation Center, just east of Notre Dame Stadium. In the Midwest sub-regional, the tournament began at the University of Houston's Hofheinz Pavilion, the on-campus home of the Houston Cougars. To date, this marks the last time two different parts of the tournament were held in the same city. In the West sub-regional, the tournament came to Logan and the campus of Utah State University for the first time, with games held at the USU Assembly Center (now known as the Dee Glen Smith Spectrum).

The tournament would mark the only time the Astrodome or the Georgia Coliseum were used. While Houston has continued to be a tournament host at various venues, this was the only time the tournament came to Athens. Houston would not host the Final Four again until 2011.

Teams

Bracket
* – Denotes overtime period

East region

Mideast region

Midwest region

West region

Final Four

Tournament notes
 Jim McDaniels of Western Kentucky had 147 points, top scorer in the playoffs.
 Austin Carr of Notre Dame scored 289 career tournament points in seven games.
 As a result of the Villanova’s forfeit to Penn, the 1971 Penn Quakers technically went undefeated but did not win the national championship. North Carolina State went undefeated in 1972–73 but did not win the national championship because they were on NCAA probation and were not eligible to participate in the NCAA tournament.

See also
 1971 NCAA College Division basketball tournament
 1971 National Invitation Tournament
 1971 NAIA Division I men's basketball tournament
 1971 National Women's Invitation Tournament

References

NCAA Division I men's basketball tournament
Ncaa
NCAA Division I men's basketball tournament
Basketball in Houston
NCAA Division I men's basketball tournament, 1971
NCAA Division I men's basketball tournament